The European Journal of Futures Research is an open access academic journal published by Springer Science+Business Media covering futures studies. It was established in 2013 and the editor-in-chief is Gerhard de Haan (Free University of Berlin).

Abstracting and indexing
The journal is abstracted and indexed in EBSCO databases, International Bibliography of Periodical Literature, ProQuest databases, Scopus, and the Social Sciences Citation Index. According to the Journal Citation Reports, the journal has a 2018 impact factor of 0.625.

References

External links

Futurology journals
Publications established in 2013
English-language journals
Springer Science+Business Media academic journals